I Get a Kick Out of Bu is an album by drummer Art Blakey and the Jazz Messengers recorded in Italy in 1988 and released on the Soul Note label.

Reception

Scott Yanow of Allmusic stated "Even after heading the Jazz Messengers for over three decades, drummer Art Blakey kept true to his original vision, using the band as a forum for talented young players to swing hard and grow rapidly".

Track listing 
 "Yang" (Philip Harper) - 7:47   
 "Good Morning Heartache" (Ervin Drake, Dan Fisher, Irene Higginbotham) - 7:47   
 "Mayreh" (Horace Silver) - 5:53   
 "Remember When" (Robin Eubanks) - 6:49   
 "Love Walked In" (George Gershwin, Ira Gershwin) - 4:46   
 "Lover Man" (Jimmy Davis, Ram Ramirez, Jimmy Sherman) - 8:23   
 "Drum Solo No. 7" (Art Blakey) - 9:12   
 "I Get a Kick Out of You" (Cole Porter) - 6:18

Personnel 
Art Blakey - drums
Philip Harper - trumpet (tracks 1, 3-5 & 8)
Robin Eubanks - trombone (tracks 1, 3-6 & 8)
Javon Jackson - tenor saxophone (tracks 1-5 & 8)
Benny Green - piano (tracks 1-6 & 8)
Leon Dorsey - bass (tracks 1-6 & 8)

References 

Art Blakey albums
The Jazz Messengers albums
1988 albums
Black Saint/Soul Note albums